Randolph William Smith (born July 7, 1965) is a Canadian former professional ice hockey player and coach.

Career 
Smith won a silver medal at the 1992 Winter Olympics. He also played three games in the National Hockey League with the Minnesota North Stars between 1986 and 1987. Smith played his final years of ice hockey in the United Kingdom for the Peterborough Pirates and Cardiff Devils. Smith also had a brief coaching stint with the Swift Current Broncos of the Western Hockey League.

Career statistics

Regular season and playoffs

International

Awards
 WHL East Second All Star Team – 1986

External links
 

1965 births
Living people
Calgary Wranglers (WHL) players
Canadian ice hockey centres
Canadian ice hockey coaches
Ice hockey people from Saskatchewan
Ice hockey players at the 1992 Winter Olympics
Kalamazoo Wings (1974–2000) players
Las Vegas Thunder players
Maine Mariners players
Medalists at the 1992 Winter Olympics
Minnesota North Stars players
Olympic ice hockey players of Canada
Olympic medalists in ice hockey
Olympic silver medalists for Canada
Salt Lake Golden Eagles (IHL) players
St. Louis Vipers players
Saskatoon Blades players
Sportspeople from Saskatoon
Springfield Indians players
Swift Current Broncos coaches
Undrafted National Hockey League players